Bobby Vinton's Greatest Hits may refer to:

 Bobby Vinton's Greatest Hits (1964 album)
 Bobby Vinton's Greatest Hits (1990 album)

See also
 Bobby Vinton discography